Maheshum Marutiyum is 2023 Indian Malayalam-language romantic comedy film written and directed by Sethu featuring Asif Ali and Mamta Mohandas.

Plot
A triangular love story between a man, a Maruti 800, and a woman. Set in 1983.

Cast
Asif Ali as Mahesh
Mamta Mohandas as Gauri
Maniyanpilla Raju
Alexander Prasanth
Vijay Babu
Idavela Babu
Kunchan
Varun Dhara

Reception 
Rating the film 3 in a scale of 5, Gopika Is from The Times of India said "Asif's movie has a good storyline and a careless climax".

References

External links

Indian romantic comedy films
2020s Malayalam-language films
2023 romantic comedy films